Chuenisbärgli is a World Cup technical ski course (and a hill) in Switzerland at Adelboden in Bernese Oberland, opened in 1955.
 
The track runs on natural terrain and is used only for annual World Cup competitions, traditionally in early January. It is one of the oldest and most classic slopes in the circuit.

It is considered the most prestigious giant slalom in the world and among the most demanding, along with Alta Badia and Kranjska Gora.

History 

In 1955 competition called "Internationalen Adelbodner Skitage" (International Adelboden Ski Days) started with slalom, giant slalom joined in 1958, with last slalom held in 1961.

In the early days of the World Cup, there was basically only one giant slalom, initially on two days (Monday 1st run / Tuesday 2nd run) and then both runs on Tuesday. 

In 1967, giant slalom joined already in the premiere World Cup season and in 2000 slalom joined the competition after decades of break. 

Since 1982 competition is being live broadcast. Competition was fully canceled in 1988, 1990, 1993 and 1994.

World Cup 
This course hosted total of 69 World Cup events for men (7th of all-time).

Men 

<small>

Club5+ 
In 1986, elite Club5 was originally founded by prestigious classic downhill organizers: Kitzbühel, Wengen, Garmisch, Val d’Isère and Val Gardena/Gröden, with goal to bring alpine ski sport on the highest levels possible.

Later over the years other classic longterm organizers joined the now named Club5+: Alta Badia, Cortina, Kranjska Gora, Maribor, Lake Louise, Schladming, Adelboden, Kvitfjell, St.Moritz and Åre.

References

External links 
 Verein Weltcup Adelboden
 Alle Infos zum Ski-Weltcup in Adelboden
 Alporama: Alp Porträt Kuenisbärgli

Alpine skiing in Switzerland
Skiing in Switzerland